Chahaki (also Romanized as Chāhakī and Chahakī) is a village in Fahlian Rural District, in the Central District of Mamasani County, Fars Province, Iran. At the 2006 census, its population was 104, in 21 families.

References 

Populated places in Mamasani County